Rosa clinophylla is a member of the genus Rosa native to the Himalayas, South Asia, and Southeast Asia.

In contrast, modern roses cannot withstand waterlogging even for two days. Seen its tolerant characteristic in tropical regions, experts including A. F. Allen was attracted to it back in 1977.

References

External links
  plate 153 Rosa clinophylla: Rosier à feuilles penchées

clinophylla
Flora of Asia